Zərgərli is a village in the municipality of Bum in the Qabala Rayon of Azerbaijan.

References

Populated places in Qabala District